Goshree Islands Development Authority (GIDA) was established in 1994. It is one of the two government agencies for the development of Kochi City Region, Kerala along with GCDA which serves entire Cochin Corporation and surrounding municipalities around the region. GIDA's main purpose, as the name suggests to develop the infrastructure facilities of scattered islands in and around the Kochi city. Its area consists of entire Vypin Island, Vallarpadam, Bolgatty-Mulavukad Island, Thanthonnithuruthu, Kadamakkudy and a group of small islands in Vembanad Lake covering an area of 100 km2. with a population of 3.5 Lakhs.

See also
 Goshree bridges

References

Economy of Kochi
State agencies of Kerala
State urban development authorities of India
Islands of Kerala
1994 establishments in Kerala
Government agencies established in 1994